Sea of the Dying Dhow, released on June 18, 2007, is the first studio album by *shels.

Track listing

References

shels albums
2007 debut albums